Full spectrum diplomacy is a combination of traditional, government-to-government diplomacy with the many components of public diplomacy as well as the integration of these two functions with other instruments of statecraft. The term was coined by Dr. John Lenczowski, the founder and president of the Institute of World Politics in Washington, D.C. in his book Full Spectrum Diplomacy and Grand Strategy:  Reforming the Structure and Culture of U.S. Foreign Policy which was released in May, 2011.

Origin 
Lenczowski's book appears to be the first attempt to isolate and define the term.  In it, he references the military concept of "full spectrum operations" (or "full spectrum dominance") indicating that it inspired his derivation for diplomatic use.  He writes that the diplomatic community does not have a comparable term to full spectrum operations, "but there should be, in order to end the systematic neglect of some dimensions of the larger art of diplomacy."

In a chapter of the Routledge Handbook of Public Diplomacy, Matthew Armstrong provides a historical perspective on the use of full spectrum diplomatic action:

Components 

Full spectrum diplomacy is an integrated strategy that encompasses all instruments of engagement including traditional diplomacy and public diplomacy.  Of particular note is advocacy for the use of cultural diplomacy to enhance contact with people at the grassroots level.

To increase the role of public diplomacy, Lenczowski advocates the foundation of a U.S. Public Diplomacy Agency.  This would not only take the place of the former United States Information Agency (USIA), but would expand to coordinate all aspects of the public diplomacy instrument.  Dr. Juliana Pilon advocates a similar organization in her book Why America is Such a Hard Sell in which she promotes an "American Global Outreach and Research Agency."  Her idea culminates in a system that links the instruments of public diplomacy throughout the whole of government.  Yet another proposal is that of Professor Carnes Lord of the Naval War College writing for the creation of a "Policy Coordinating Committee on Foreign Information, Assistance, and Democracy Promotion" that would serve to integrate the leadership of the many organizations involved in public diplomacy to other agencies of strategic influence.

Lenczowski provides further explanation of the construct here:

Orchestra analogy 

In support of the concept of full spectrum diplomacy, Lenczowski writes that "the achievement of foreign policy goals requires a multiplicity of means that can be likened to instruments in an orchestra."  Additionally, he states that "the conduct of full spectrum diplomacy thus involves the proper orchestration of both traditional and public diplomacy in such a fashion that the policies governing each function do not jeopardize the effectiveness of the other."

This collected orchestration becomes a part of what Lenczowski calls an “integrated strategy” defined by "a concept that requires the coordination of all the instruments of statecraft, including military policy, intelligence, counterintelligence, economic policy, etc."

A previous use of this musical ensemble analogy for an instrument of statecraft is found in a World War II Soviet anti-Nazi espionage element commonly known as the Red Orchestra.

Purpose 
The purpose of full spectrum diplomacy is to promote what Lenczowski calls an "influence culture."  This environment includes a more versatile diplomatic corps to accompany an increased focus on public diplomacy. It is a comprehensive approach that will employ many of the elements of what Harvard professor Joseph Nye calls soft power and what a number of scholars and government officials refer to as smart power.  The influence culture and resulting integrated strategy of the "orchestra" allow for a broader international approach.  In lieu of too quickly resorting to hard power such as military action, the engagement of full spectrum diplomacy provides for a variety of possible non-military actions that could pre-empt the need for armed conflict.

Scholars have been calling for this approach to American grand strategy for years.  Paul Kennedy writes that the U.S. "needs to integrate its political, economic, and military aims in a coherent fashion, for years of peace as well as the possibility of war."  In his book Soft Power, Joseph Nye asserts that "America's success will depend upon our developing a deeper understanding of the role of soft power and developing a better balance of hard and soft power in our foreign policy.". The resulting "smart power" provides a distinct tie-in to the idea of full spectrum diplomacy.  Finally, Professor Colin S. Gray calls for a "fully functioning 'strategy bridge' that binds together, adaptably, the realms of policy and military behavior.".

Use of the concept in academia and journalism 
Though a relatively new term in the lexicon of statecraft, full spectrum diplomacy is already found in reference to contemporary events.  In a February 28, 2011 commentary piece from the U.N. Dispatch, Mark Leon Goldberg references the term in the title: "The Obama Administration’s Full Spectrum Diplomacy on Libya."  In defense of the Obama Administration's strategy in the North African nation, he writes that: "After the unanimous passage of a strong Security Council resolution on Libya on Saturday, there appears to be a full spectrum diplomatic push led by the Obama administration to make sure that the provisions called for in the resolution are swiftly and effectively imposed."

Other references, which occur prior to Lenczowski's initial use of the term, utilize similar terminology or imply the same conceptual framework.

In March 2009 Congressional testimony, George Moose, former U.S. Assistant Secretary of State for African Affairs, urged the development of a larger and more versatile diplomatic corps:

In a July 2006 article promoting 'full spectrum analysis' at the strategic level, Adrian Wolfberg,  the director of the Knowledge Laboratory at the Defense Intelligence Agency, wrote that "the warfighter now operates along many lines at once and across a full spectrum of possible actions, either diplomatic, intelligence-driven, military, or economic in nature.

See also 
 Engagement (diplomacy)
 Hostage diplomacy
 Public diplomacy
 Public diplomacy of the United States
 Cultural diplomacy
 Soft power
 Hard power
 smart power
 Foreign policy
 Foreign policy of the United States

References

External links 
 John Lenczowski discussing his book and the concept on Secure Freedom Radio.

International relations
Diplomacy
Political science terminology
International relations terminology
Strategy
Neologisms